Frank Gordon may refer to:

 Frank Gordon (Yes Minister character), a fictional character in the 1980s British sitcom Yes Minister and its sequel Yes, Prime Minister
 Frank Gordon (rugby union) (1879–1925), Welsh rugby union player
 Frank Gordon Jr. (1929–2020), Arizona Supreme Court justice
 Frank Gordon, a fictional character in the U.S. TV series, Gotham
 B. Frank Gordon, officer in the Confederate States Army